Rather Be Rockin, the second album by the band Tantrum,  was released in 1979.

Track listing
 Rather Be Rockin'
 Don't Turn Me Off
 You Are The World
 Sammy And Susie
 Runnin'
 How Long
 You Need Me
 Take A Look
 Applaud The Winner
 Search For A Reason

Musicians
Pam Bradley         - Lead & Backing Vocals
Sandy Caulfield     - Lead & Backing Vocals
Barb Erber          - Lead & Backing Vocals
Ray Sapko           - Guitar, Vocals
Phil Balsano        - Keyboards, Vocals
Bill Syniar         - Bass, Vocals
Vern Wennerstrom    - Drums, Percussion

1979 albums